Pseudafreutreta is a genus of tephritid  or fruit flies in the family Tephritidae.

Species
Pseudafreutreta bicolor Munro, 1957
Pseudafreutreta biseriata (Bezzi, 1924)
Pseudafreutreta fatua Hering, 1942

References

Tephritinae
Tephritidae genera
Diptera of Africa